John Huggins Boyd (July 31, 1799 – July 2, 1868) was an American politician and a U.S. Representative from New York. He was the last member of the Whig Party to represent New York's 14th District.

Biography
Born in Salem, New York, Boyd attended the common schools and was graduated from Washington Academy, Salem, New York, in 1818. He studied law and was admitted to the bar in 1823.

Career
Boyd commenced practice in Salem, New York, but shortly afterward moved to Whitehall, New York. He was elected Justice of the Peace in 1828 and served for many years, and also served as member of the New York State Assembly in 1840. He was Supervisor of Whitehall in 1845, 1848, and 1849.

Elected as a Whig to the Thirty-second Congress Boyd was United States Representative for the fourteenth district of New York from March 4, 1851, to March 3, 1853. He served as special surrogate of Washington County from 1857 to 1859. He was elected president of the village of Whitehall, Washington County, New York.  He resumed the practice of law.

Death
Boyd died in Whitehall, Washington County, New York, on July 2, 1868 (age 68 years, 337 days). He is interred at Evergreen Cemetery, Salem, New York.

References

External links
 Finding Aid to John H. Boyd Papers, 1835-1863 at the New York State Library, accessed January 28, 2016

Govtrack US Congress
The Political Graveyard

1799 births
1868 deaths
New York (state) state court judges
Members of the New York State Assembly
Whig Party members of the United States House of Representatives from New York (state)
19th-century American politicians
People from Salem, New York
People from Whitehall, New York
19th-century American judges